Michael David 'Mike' Humiston was born January 8, 1959, in Oceanside, San Diego County, California. He is a graduate of Anderson High School, in Anderson, Shasta County, California. He was a member of the Tehama County (Calif.) Sheriff's Department for six years, where he served as a patrol officer and then a detective. He is a former American football linebacker. He played for the Buffalo Bills in 1981, the Baltimore Colts in 1982, the Indianapolis Colts in 1984 and for the San Diego Chargers in 1987. He was the head coach for Waynesburg University baseball program [The Yellow Jacket's] In Waynesburg, Greene County, Pennsylvania. He is currently the Director of the Department of Public Safety at Waynesburg University.

References

1959 births
Living people
American football linebackers
Weber State Wildcats football players
Buffalo Bills players
Baltimore Colts players
Indianapolis Colts players
San Diego Chargers players